Ivor the Engine is a British cutout animation television series created by Oliver Postgate and Peter Firmin's Smallfilms company. It follows the adventures of a small green steam locomotive who lives in the "top left-hand corner of Wales" and works for The Merioneth and Llantisilly Railway Traction Company Limited. His friends include Jones the Steam, Evans the Song and Dai Station, among many other characters.

Background
Having produced the live Alexander the Mouse, and the stop motion animated The Journey of Master Ho for his employers Associated Rediffusion/ITV in partnership with Firmin, Oliver Postgate and his partner set up Smallfilms in a disused cow shed at Firmin's home in Blean, near Canterbury, Kent.

Ivor the Engine was Smallfilms' first production, and drew inspiration from Postgate's World War II encounter with Welshman Denzyl Ellis, a former railway locomotive fireman with the Royal Scot train, who described how steam engines came to life when you spent time steaming them up in the morning. Postgate decided to locate the story to North Wales, as it was more inspirational than the flat terrain of the English Midlands. The story lines drew heavily on, and were influenced by, the works of South Wales poet Dylan Thomas.

Production
Ivor the Engine used stop motion animation, of cardboard cut-outs painted with watercolours.

The series was originally made for black and white television by Smallfilms for Associated Rediffusion in 1958, but was later revived in 1975 when new episodes in colour were produced for the BBC.

The series was written, animated and narrated by Oliver Postgate. Peter Firmin provided the artwork. The sound effects were endearingly low-tech, with the sound of Ivor's puffing made vocally by Postgate himself. The music was composed by Vernon Elliott and predominantly featured a solo bassoon, to reflect the three notes of Ivor's whistle.

Voices were performed by Oliver Postgate, Anthony Jackson and Olwen Griffiths. Anthony Jackson provided the voices for Dai Station, Evans the Song and Mr Dinwiddy.

Episodes
The original series was in black and white and comprised six episodes which told how Ivor wanted to sing in the choir, and how his whistle was replaced with steam organ pipes from the fairground organ on Mr Morgan's roundabout. There then followed two thirteen-episode series, also in black and white. Black and white episodes were 10 minutes each.

In the 1970s, the two longer black and white series were re-made in colour, with some alterations to the stories, but they did not revisit the original six. The colour series consisted of 40 five-minute films. These would often each form part of a longer story.

Although the six original black and white episodes were subsequently released on video, the two longer black and white series (totaling 26 episodes) were not and for many years were thought to have been lost. In October 2010, however, film copies of all 26 episodes were discovered in a pig shed.

When the colour series was subsequently released on DVD, some of the episodes whose content linked, were edited together, with the relevant closing and opening titles and credits removed.

The colour series episodes were:

Home releases
Throughout the 1980s and the early '90s, the BBC released a few videos of Ivor the Engine.

In 1984, a single 57-minute compiled video called Ivor the Engine and the Dragons with 13 stories joined up together as an omnibus.

In 1985, a single 58-minute compiled video called Ivor the Engine and the Elephants with 13 stories joined up together as an omnibus. In 1995, the video was re-released in different packaging.

In the early 1990s a video with six black and white stories of the very first Ivor the Engine series in the late-1950s (previously broadcast on Associated-Rediffusion) and seven colour episodes of the 1970s BBC series of Ivor the Engine, all shown as single episodes, was released. The video was introduced by Oliver Postgate.

In 2000, a video called The Complete Ivor The Engine containing all 26 colour episodes was released by Universal.

Characters

Ivor
Ivor is the steam locomotive of the Merioneth and Llantisilly Rail Traction Company Limited. Unlike real ones, he has a mind of his own. Ivor can drive himself and use his whistle to communicate. His fondest dream is to sing with the Grumbly and District Choral Society, a dream that is realised when his whistle is replaced with three pipes from an old fairground organ. He becomes the first bass of the choir, as well as providing them with a means of getting from place to place.

Ivor enjoys doing all sorts of things that humans do. As well as singing in the choir, he likes visiting the seaside, making tea from his boiler and spending time with his friends. He is fond of animals, and has several of them among his friends. He can be wilful and disobedient at times, and it is not unknown for him to go and do his own thing when he should be working. He dislikes shunting and timetables.

Jones the Steam
Edwin Jones is Ivor's driver. He is a cheerful and kind-hearted man who perhaps sympathises more than most railway staff with Ivor's idiosyncrasies. Postgate and Firmin describe him as "an ordinary engine driver who is there to cope with whatever needs to be coped with". People who are new to the area find him rather eccentric for talking to his engine.

When not driving Ivor or helping the engine with his latest flight of fancy, he enjoys fishing and day-dreaming.

Dai Station
The station master at Llaniog. He is a stickler for the regulations of the railway, but sometimes bends the rules to help his friends. His life is made a little difficult by the fact that Ivor really doesn't care much for regulations at all. Although he is often gloomy and overly strict, he is a good person at heart.

Owen the Signal
Owen the Signal inhabits a signal box near Ivor's shed and makes an occasional appearance in the episodes.

Evans the Song
Evan Evans is the portly choirmaster of the Grumbly and District Choral Society. He is also Jones the Steam's wife's uncle.

Mrs Porty
A rich and eccentric aristocratic lady who enjoys the occasional glass of port and has new hats sent from London every week. She is also technically the owner of the railway, having bought it when the line was threatened with nationalisation. However, she does not bother much with the day-to-day running and things remained much the same after she bought it.

Mr Dinwiddy
A very odd, possibly insane miner who lives in the hills and digs for gold. He enjoys explosions and mining. In fact, his mountain is full of gold, but as soon as he digs it up, he puts it back again. He often has need of new boots.

He is something of an amateur scientist. He describes himself as "educated" and knows "something about rock". He has constructed a few odd devices, including a donkey carriage and a bubble-blowing machine.

Bani Moukerjee
An elephant keeper from India, who works for Charlie Banger's Circus. He is in charge of the elephants Alice, George, Margaret and Clarence, who all obey him without question.

Charlie Banger 
The eponymous and larger-than-life owner of Charlie Banger's Circus, who arranges a free show for the town in order to thank Jones, Evans and Mr Hughes for their help in looking after Alice the Elephant following her injury.

Idris the Dragon
A small, red Welsh dragon who also sings in the choir for a time. Having been hatched from an egg in Ivor's fire, he lives with his wife Olwen and any of their twins, Daian and Blodwen, in the extinct volcano Smoke Hill. As well as singing, he proves useful by cooking fish and chips for the choir using his fiery breath.

On the other hand, Idris runs into trouble when Smoke Hill goes cold and needs to be kept hot in order to survive. The gasboard provide a temporary furnace, but when that became too expensive (and decimalisation renders the slot-machine inoperable), the only other option for the dragons is a heated cage. Luckily, Mr Dinwiddy is able to provide a solution, and they now live in a geothermally-heated cave under the ground.

Alice the Elephant
A circus elephant with Charlie Banger's Circus. She is normally placid, but does not like taking medicine or being bathed by anyone except her owner, Bani Moukerjee. When Ivor met her, she had escaped and was asleep on the track with an injured foot. Since then they have become friends. She and her elephant friends were able to help Ivor when he got stuck in the snow.

Bluebell the Donkey
A donkey who lives at Mrs Porty's house. She cannot talk, but she and Ivor just enjoy sitting around together. As the Merioneth and Llantisilly Rail Traction Company Limited has only one locomotive (apart from the short service of Juggernaut), Bluebell is sometimes called upon to provide motive power. Examples include the towing by chain of the broken down locomotive Juggernaut and also the pulling of Mrs Porty's donkey cart when this was temporarily set on the railway tracks to pursue 'robbers' when Ivor had been 'stolen' in the episode The Lost Engine; in this latter case, like a locomotive, Bluebell strictly observed the railway signals, halting the chase until Owen the Signal had raised the signal arm.

Morgan the Roundabout
Mr Morgan is the fairground owner. He gave Ivor some pipes from the steam organ on his roundabout, so that Ivor could sing in the choir. He only appeared in the very first black and white series.

Claude Gilbert
Claude Gilbert was the station master of Tan-y-Gylch station in the original black-and-white series, and would share a cup of tea with Jones whilst Ivor rested at the platform. It was he who directed Jones and Dai to Mr Jenkins the Builder when they were searching for organ pipes to replace Ivor's whistle. Like Mr Morgan, he only appeared in the first black and white series and was not seen again.

Mr Hughes The Gasworks
The gruff but kind-hearted proprietor of the local gasworks, he is well known for keeping pets, in particular budgerigars. He is asked to provide shelter for Alice the Elephant when she has an injured foot, and, despite his initial reluctance, he more than rises to the occasion.

Miss Ludgrove
The local vet, with a dry sense of humour, who comes to examine Alice's injured foot.

Mr Brangwyn
A robust and larger-than-life pigeon-fancier, who occupies a house by the railway, and is engaged to Miss Price from Llangubbin. It is Mr Brangwyn who provides the elephant's boot for Alice: he obtained said boot during the time he once spent in India.

Mrs Williams
The local postmistress, who is a bit batty and a bit of a gossip. She occasionally interacts with Jones and Ivor.

Eli The Baker
The feisty but big-hearted and hard-working local baker.

Mrs Thomas
The local fish-and-chip shop owner. A plump woman with a big voice, she is kind and cheerful and serves the choir with food after their sessions.

Policeman Gregory
Mainly known as P.C. Gregory. The local and only village policeman. One of his most notable happenings is after Ivor went to keep the chickens warm on his boiler. Jones and Dai find 3 small eggs in Ivor's coal bunker, and after a small "finders-keepers" argument they are interrupted by P.C. Gregory, who then removes his helmet (which was padded on the inside) and takes the eggs. After he leaves Dai asks if the farmer will ever see those 3 eggs again, as P.C. Gregory likes a good egg in the morning.

Professor Longfellow
This seemingly batty professor was only seen in a few episodes. He was famously known for ordering a telescope cover; however, as it was one of Ivor's deliveries, Mrs Porty believes it is her newest hat, and wears it to a meeting later in the episode. He was also notable for telling Jones, Idris, and Dai, that the closest active volcano to the now extinct "Smoke Hill" is in southern Italy.

Mr Mervin
The local bank manager. He only appears in a few episodes; his most notable appearance is his and Jones's adventure to find more half-crowns for the gas meter powering "Smoke-Hill".
As this episode takes place when decimalisation occurs, Jones must inform Idris and Co. that there are no more half-crowns in Wales and that "you have had the lot". They go and find in a small shop, an old tin teapot full to the brim with half-crowns. "Smoke-Hill" is gas fired for the final time until the dragons go to Mr Dinwiddy and his geothermal heated cave.

Mrs Griffiths
Mrs Griffiths is a member of the Welsh Antiquarian Society and a passionate believer in Dragons. She first came to seeking Jones the Steam in hopes of finding Idris the dragon, after hearing that dragons had been sighted in Llannyog. Idris had already run away by this point after learning that people were looking for him so Jones misled Mrs Griffiths into giving up the search by pretending to be an insane person who spoke to railway engines (Ivor enhanced Jones' performance by not blowing his own whistle). 

When Idris' home Smoke Hill lost its heat, Jones and Ivor took Idris to see Mrs Griffiths in her shop in Llanmadd. After seeing Idris and his brethren, and Ivor's self-whistling, Mrs Griffiths apologises to Jones for thinking him mad and agrees to help the dragons. Mrs Griffiths and her fellows at the Antiquarian Society hire Mr Hughes the Gasworks to fit out Smoke Hill with gas heating and in the series one finale Smoke Hill, now a gas-fired volcano, is reignited and all the characters sing in gladness. However, the gas-heating includes a gas meter that only takes half-crowns, which are no longer "legal tender". On a few occasions, the gas meter runs out and Jones and Ivor have to search high and low for more half crowns. 

Eventually, they use up all the half crowns in their part of Wales so they return to Mrs Griffiths for help, but Jones leaves Ivor alone in a siding while he speaks to Mrs Griffiths and two of the dragons, who were in Ivor's firebox, decide to fly about the town. They come across a statue of St. George famously slaying a dragon. The dragons, being quite young and naïve, attack St George's statue with jets of fire in the hope of saving the dragon. When Mrs Griffiths and Jones the Steam arrive, she - being horrified by the sight of two dragons attacking the statue - accuses them of vandalism and tells Jones to take them away.

Juggernaut
The Juggernaut is a diesel rail lorry made out of bits, bobs and flanged wheels, which appears towards the end of the series. Due to its inadequate brakes, it runs down a hill and falls into the lake soon after starting service, nearly killing Idris, whom it was carrying on a chestnut barrow.

Books
Ivor the Engine was published by Abelard Schuman in 1962.

Six story books, based upon the TV series were published in the 1970s and reprinted in 2006/07:
 Ivor the Engine: The first story
 Ivor the Engine: Snowdrifts
 Ivor the Engine: The dragon
 Ivor the Engine: The elephant
 Ivor the Engine: The Foxes
 Ivor the Engine: Ivor's Birthday
 The Ivor the Engine Annual circa 1978.

As the books were published in the early days of political correctness, London Borough of Hackney Public Libraries banned the entire series because of the Indian elephant keeper, called Bani. They thought ethnic minorities might be offended by him.

Influences and future appearances

 Postgate and Firmin created a map of their fictional railway which was adhered to rigidly during filming.
 The Who include a character named 'Ivor The Engine Driver' in their song "A Quick One, While He's Away", which appears on their 1966 album 'A Quick One'.
 British ska band Bad Manners also name check Ivor, on their 1980 album Loonee Tunes! with a track called "The Undersea Adventures of Ivor the Engine".
 In The Amazing Adventures of Morph episode "The Magic Wand", when Gobbledygook the alien is trying to change Chas back into a dog, Ivor, painted in navy blue with his name "Ivor" in black, makes a cameo appearance.
 In 2007 'All Aboard with Ivor' events were held at various heritage railways around the UK following the modification of a small Peckett industrial locomotive to resemble Ivor. Railways hosting the event include the Battlefield Line Railway in Leicestershire, the Watercress Line in Hampshire and the Cholsey and Wallingford Railway in Oxfordshire.
 BBC2 Wales revived Ivor for a series of promotional spots advertising their new digital television channel "2W" for Wales. Oliver Postgate and Anthony Jackson provided new dialogue for these spots.
 Some of the artwork from production is on display at the Rupert the Bear Museum, along with several other items from Smallfilm's history. The Rupert Bear Museum is now part of the Canterbury Heritage Museum in Stour Street, Canterbury.
 In April 2011, Smallfilms collaborated with mobile gaming company Dreadnought Design to launch an Ivor the Engine game under the newly created Smallworlds brand.
 In June 2014, Smallfilms collaborated with board game company Surprised Stare Games to launch an Ivor the Engine boardgame.
 Gideon Coe uses Ivor's Cruising Theme as the musical bed over his last song leading up to midnight on BBC 6 Music to say nighty night.
 The Sittingbourne and Kemsley Light Railway hold an annual Ivor the Engine Weekend in August.
 Functional programming language Idris was named after the dragon in the show.

References

External links 
 Smallfilms – Ivor last updated 2007
 BBC Wales Arts – Ivor the Engine
 
 
 British Film Institute Screen Online

Television series by Smallfilms
British children's animated adventure television series
BBC children's television shows
British stop-motion animated television series
English-language television shows
Fictional locomotives
ITV children's television shows
Television series about rail transport
1959 British television series debuts
1959 British television series endings
1975 British television series debuts
1977 British television series endings
1950s British children's television series
1970s British children's television series
1950s animated television series
1970s animated television series
Welsh short stories
Television shows set in Wales